Ed Cook may refer to:

 Ed Cook (American football) (1932–2007), American National Football League offensive lineman
 Ed Cook (basketball), American college basketball player and coach

See also
 Eddie Cook (disambiguation)
 Edward Cook (disambiguation)